Héroe is the Spanish version of Mariah Carey's song "Hero". This version was almost given to Gloria Estefan, but the version was performed by Carey. The English version, released in 1993, was Carey's eighth #1 hit single . The Mexican, Argentinian, and Spanish bonus track for Music Box has the Spanish track. The Spanish adaptation was made by Jorge Luis Piloto.

Critical reception
This is the first song in Spanish by Mariah Carey. The track was well received by Latin America, Spain, and by Latinos in the United States. Critics thought that her pronunciation was not entirely right but okay, accepting this song as a hit. The song was criticized by Spanish speaking fans saying that the adaptation was unworthy to the original version. The song reached also the Top 10 in several countries.

Chart performance

References

Singles